Piotr Snopek (born April 6, 1991 in Toruń, Poland) is a Polish pair skater. With partner Magdalena Jaskółka, they are three times Polish national medallists. They have competed internationally on the junior level at 2010-2011 and 2011-2012 Junior Grand Prix events. They retired in the middle of 2012-2013 season.

Before he moved to Oświęcim to skate in pairs, he competes as a singles skater at the national level in Start-Wisla Torun club.

Programs 
(with Jaskolka)

Competitive highlights 
(with Jaskolka)

References

External links 
 

Polish male pair skaters
1991 births
Living people
Sportspeople from Toruń